Magellan Aerospace Corporation is a Canadian manufacturer of aerospace systems and components. Magellan also repairs and overhauls, tests, and provides aftermarket support services for engines, and engine structural components. The company's business units are divided into the product areas of aeroengines, aerostructures, rockets and space, and specialty products.  Its corporate offices in Mississauga, Ontario, Magellan operates in facilities throughout Canada, the United States, and the United Kingdom.

Magellan is a component supplier for the Airbus A380, the Boeing 787 Dreamliner, the F-35 Joint Strike Fighter, and Bombardier's complete line of business and commuter aircraft.  Magellan also supplies gas turbine components for airplanes, helicopters, and military vehicles such as the M1 Abrams.

History

Magellan was formed in 1996 from the remains of Fleet Industries, a subsidiary of the US-based Fleet Aerospace located in Fort Erie, Ontario. They produced products and services for the Canadian military, as well as subassemblies for aviation companies.

Through the 1990s, Magellan expanded, buying a number of Canadian aviation companies. These included:

 Orenda Aerospace (c. 1946 and now Magellan Repair, Overhaul and Industrial) in Toronto and acquired in 1997
 Bristol Aerospace (c. 1930) of Winnipeg and acquired in 1997
 Chicopee Manufacturing Limited (c. 1953) in Kitchener, Ontario 
 Haley Industries (c. 1952) of Haley Station, Ontario, and acquired 2002

Several US companies were also added, including Aeronca (formerly part of the US-based portions of Fleet), AMBEL Precision Manufacturing, Ellanef Manufacturing, Middleton Aerospace and Presto Casting Company. They also purchased the assets of Mayflower Aerospace in England, becoming Magellan Aerospace UK in 2003.
The Fleet Aerospace division was closed in 2003, was sold, and later re-opened as Fleet Canada Inc.  Magellan Aerospace is now an integrated, international company and all of its subsidiaries are wholly owned, operating under the Magellan name.

Projects

Magellan Aerospace also manufactures structures and assemblies for commercial and defence aircraft manufacturers:
 General Electric - F101, F110, F404, F414, J79, J85, CF34, CF700, CJ610, LM2500, LM7000, CFE738, T64, CF6 
 Pratt & Whitney - PW100 Series, PW300 Series, PW500 Series, PW 200, PW4000, PT6, TF33, JT9D, JT15D
 Rolls-Royce - RTM322, RB211, T406, T800, RR Trent and RB211Industrial, AE 3007, F136
 Honeywell - AS900, AGT1500 (used in the M-1 Abrams tank), ALF507, TF40/50, T53 (used in the UH-1 helicopter), T55, LF502
 Volvo - RM12
 A380 Inner Fixed Trailing Edge

Capabilities

 Engine core manufacturing
 Exhaust systems and flow paths
 Engine and component repair and overhaul
 Sand casting
 Materials and engine testing
 Composite structures and assemblies
 Bonded engine and structure components
 Machined components
 Aircraft refurbishment
 Engineering services (Detail Stress/Design of Aerostructures using CATIA/ MSc PATRAN/NASTRAN Classical Hand Calcs)
 Rocket weapons systems
 Rocketry fuel production
 Suborbital rocket systems
 Meteorological rocket systems
 Space and satellite subsystems and components
 Industrial power packages - OT3 engines
 Wire strike protection for helicopters
 Engine development testing services
 Engine test facility maintenance support

References

External links
 Magellan Aerospace

Companies listed on the Toronto Stock Exchange
Aircraft engine manufacturers of Canada
Defence companies of Canada
Space industry companies of Canada